Tek Lal Mahto (15 February 1945 – 27 September 2011) was a member of the 14th Lok Sabha of India. He was one of the founders and key members of the Jharkhand Mukti Morcha (JMM) political party, and served five terms in the Jharkhand state legislature. He was a delegate to the Bihar assembly in 1985, represented the Giridih constituency in the Lok Sabha between 2004 and 2009, and JMM from Mandu Assembly constituency at the time of his death. He died of a cardiac arrest at the hospital of Rajendra Institute of Medical Sciences where he was admitted the day before. He was survived by wife, two sons Ram Prakash Bhai Patel and Jai Prakash Bhai Patel with three daughters.

References

1945 births
2011 deaths
Lok Sabha members from Jharkhand
India MPs 2004–2009
Jharkhand Mukti Morcha politicians
People from Hazaribagh
Members of the Jharkhand Legislative Assembly